Drama Juniors is an Indian Kannada-language talent search reality television show.The show comprises 4 seasons. The first season aired on 30 April 2016. It started airing on Zee Kannada and digitally on Zee5. Directed by Anil Kumar J, writers are Keerthi Narayan, Aanand, Suniel, Lokesh, Sharanappa, Nithin Ramachandra and Mentors are Ganapa, Vijay Shetty, Manjunath Badiger, Chandrashekar

Season 1
Contestants
 Puttaraju Hugar - Joint Winner
 Chitraali Tejpal Bolar - Joint Winner
 Mahendra Prasad
 Amogha S P
 Tushar Gowda 
 Revathi K R Gowda 
 Tejaswini Shivprasad
 M Achintya Puranik
 Mahati Vaishnavi Bhat
 Praneeth P
 Nihal Sagar Vishnu 
 A S Suraj 
 Abhishek Rayanna
 Aditya Manohar 
 Aryan M
 Amogh M Kerur
 Araghya Sai
 Anshika K M
 Kamalesh Kumar S

Season 2
Contestants
 Alaap
 Govardhan S Badiger 
 Sharvari V
 Aradya S Shetty
 Veeksha Naik
 Deeksha H
 Aishwarya G
 Lahari M J
 Shreesha R S 
 Harsha R.V
 Arushi Hegde
 Amogha Krishna V
 Preetham M K
 Divyashri
 Anup Ramana Sharma N.M
 Shravya S Acharya
 Sumith R Sankoji - second runner up
 Vamshi Rathnakumar - winner
 Amith Mb - winner

Season 3
Contestants
 Anup
 Anurag Patil
 Anvisha
 Basava Kiran
 Dimpana
 Kushal Gowda
 Manju
 Neha Hegde
 Nithya Hegde
 Prajwal Hugar
 Prekshit Raj
 Sinchana Koteshwara
 Somesh
 Srushti R Shetty
 Supraja Kamat
 Swathi Nipyanala

Season 4
Contestants

 RIDHI S
 SATVIK SATISH MUGANNAVAR
 RACHANA G
 BHARGAV R GOWDA
 PARICHITHA H R
 CHIRANT CHANDRASHEKHAR KUMBAR
 RESHMA N
 VEDIK KAUSHAL - third runner up
 N APEKSHA
 YAJATH G
 SAMRUDDHI S MOGAVEERA - winner
 BHAIRAVI M
 DHANYA DINESH
 PRARTHANA S RAIKAR
 SANIDYA  - second runner up
 GOWTHAM RAJ R - second runner up
 VISHWA SHANKAR LAKKUNDI
 PARIKSHITH G
 JATIN J
 KHUSHI ANANDA GOULI
 RITU SINGH
 POORVI G D
 SRUSHTI NARAYAN DASAR
 ARUN KUMAR Special Contestant
 SIDDHARTH GOUDA G PATIL

References

2016 Indian television series debuts
Talent shows
Zee Kannada original programming
Kannada-language television shows